Darul oloom (Arabic: دار العلوم, transliterated dar al-`ulum), also spelled darul ulum, dar al-ulum etc., may refer to:

Darul uloom, an Arabic term which literally meaning "house of knowledge". The term generally means an Islamic seminary or educational institution
Dar Al Uloom University, university in Saudi Arabia
Darul Uloom Madrasa, Khulna, Bangladesh
Dar-ul-Uloom, Karachi, Islamic education university (Madrasa) in Karachi, Pakistan
Darul Uloom Deoband, Islamic school in India where the Deobandi Islamic movement was started
Faculty of Dar Al Uloom Cairo University
Al-Jamiatul Ahlia Darul Ulum Moinul Islam, popularly known as the Hathazari Madrassah or the "Boro Madrassah", educational institution in Hathazari, Chittagong, Bangladesh
Darul Uloom Amjadia, Karachi, Pakistan
Darul Uloom Naeemia, Karachi, Pakistan
Darul Uloom CTIEC, Cape Town, South Africa
Darul Uloom Pretoria, Laudium, South Africa
Darul-uloom Nadwatul Ulama, Lucknow, India
Darul Uloom Zakariyya, Lenasia, South Africa
Darul Uloom Birmingham, Birmingham, England
Darul Uloom London, London, England
Jamia Uloom ul Islamia, Karachi, Pakistan
Darul Uloom Haqqania, Akora Khattak, Khyber Pakhtunkhwa, Pakistan
Darul Uloom Al-Madania, Buffalo, New York
Darul Uloom Al-Arabiyyah al Islamiyyah, Strand, Cape Town, South Africa
Ahsan-Ul-Uloom, or Jamiah Arabia Ahsan-Ul-UloomKarachi, Pakistan
Jamiah Darul Uloom Zahedan, Zahedan, Iran
Al-Jamiatul Ahlia Darul Ulum Moinul Islam, Hathazari, Bangladesh
Darul Uloom Bolton, Bolton, England